The Apa Lină is a left tributary of the river Bărzăuța in Romania. It flows through the Nemira Mountains.

References

Rivers of Romania
Rivers of Harghita County